Crystal oscillators can be manufactured for oscillation over a wide range of frequencies, from a few kilohertz up to several hundred megahertz. Many applications call for a crystal oscillator frequency conveniently related to some other desired frequency, so hundreds of standard crystal frequencies are made in large quantities and stocked by electronics distributors. Using frequency dividers, frequency multipliers and phase locked loop circuits, it is practical to derive a wide range of frequencies from one reference frequency.

The UART column shows the highest common baud rate (under 1,000,000), assuming a clock pre-divider of 16 is resolved to an exact integer baud rate.  Though some UART variations have fractional dividers, those concepts are ignored to simplify this table.

References

Electronic oscillators
Electrical components